Wolter is a given name and surname of Low German and Low Franconian origin. It is equivalent to the English Walter, High German Walther, Dutch Wouter and French Gauthier. People with the name Wolter include:

Given name
 Wolter von Plettenberg (c. 1450–1535), leader of the Teutonic knights
 Gerhard Wolter Molanus (1633–1722), Lutheran theologian and abbot
 Wolter Robert van Hoëvell (1812–1879), Dutch minister, politician, reformer, and writer
 Koenraad Wolter Swart (1916–1992), Dutch-American historian
 Robert Wolter Monginsidi (1925–1949), Indonesian independence fighter
 Wolter Wierbos (born 1957), Dutch jazz trombonist
 Wolter Kroes (born 1968), Dutch pop singer

Surname
 Adolph Wolter (1903–1980), German-born American sculptor
 Bernard C. Wolter (1852–1936), American politician
 Birthe Wolter (born 1981), German actress
 Charlotte Wolter (1834–1897), German actress
 Franz-Erich Wolter, German computer scientist
 Hans Wolter (1911–1978), German physicist
 Harry Wolter (1884–1970), American baseball player
 Horst Wolter (born 1942), German footballer
 Karl Wolter (1894–1959), German footballer
 Kimberly-Rose Wolter, American actress, writer and producer
 Maurus Wolter (1825–1890), German abbot
 Michel Wolter (born 1962), Luxembourgian politician
 Mirko Wolter (born 1976), German speedway rider
 Philippe Wolter (1959–2005), Belgian actor
 Ralf Wolter (1926–2022), German actor
 Scott Wolter, American television personality and geologist
 Sherilyn Wolter (born 1951), American actress
 Thomas Wolter (born 1963), German footballer
 Waldemar Wolter (1908–1947), German concentration camp physician
 Whitey Wolter (1899–1947), American football player
 Niels Wolter (born 1979), International Director of ESL, Global Esports Company

Others
Wolter Monginsidi Airport in South East Sulawesi, Indonesia
Wolter telescope, a telescope for X-rays named after Hans Wolter

See also
 Walter (name)
 Wollter
 Wolters

Dutch masculine given names
Germanic given names
German-language surnames